The 10th Independent Red Banner Air Defence Army (Military Unit Number 41137) was an army of the Soviet Air Defence Forces, active from 1960 to 1994. The headquarters was at Arkhangelsk, Arkhangelsk Oblast.

The army originated from the White Sea Air Defence Corps of the Northern Military District (Soviet Union), which was commanded by twice Hero of the Soviet Union General-major Pyotr Pokryshev:
 White Sea Air Defence Corps (since 1954);
 Northern Military District (since 17.06.1958);
 10th Independent Air Defense Army (from 24.03.1960);
 10th Independent Red Banner Air Defence Army (from 30.04.1975);

Northern Air Defence Army 

To cover the European North in 1958 on the basis of the White Sea Air Defence Corps, the Northern Air Defence Army was formed in accordance with a directive of the General Staff of the Air Defence Forces dated June 17, 1958. The new army included:
 Northern Air Defence Corps (Severomorsk), which included:
 91st Fighter Aviation Division;
 216th Fighter Aviation Division PVO, the former 282nd Fighter Aviation Division (Vaskovo);
 antiaircraft artillery regiments;
 Radio engineering units;
 Polyarny Air Defence Division (Belushya Guba, Novaya Zemlya);
 Units of direct subordination of the army;
 34th communication center.

In 1959 a Guards air defence artillery regiment was incorporated into the Northern Air Defence Corps; subsequently, the anti-aircraft missile brigade (Peninsula)]). In 1960, an air defence missile regiment (upgraded into a brigade) was relocated from the Odessa Air Defence Corps to the Arkhangelsk Region with its control point in Mirny. To strengthen fighter aviation, the 524th Fighter Aviation Regiment was transferred from the Air Force of the Northern Fleet, reequipped with the Yak-25, and relocated to Letneozersky Plesetsk District.

On March 24, 1960, the Commander-in-Chief of the Air Defence Forces decided to transform the Northern Army into the 10th Independent Air Defence Army. Subordinate formations were also assigned combined-arms numbers:
 Northern Air Defence Corps - 21st Air Defence Corps;
 Polyarny Air Defence Division - 4th Air Defence Division

Around 1965, the 359th Independent Transport Aviation Regiment, Military Unit Number 28064, was formed at Vaskovo Airport, Arkhangelsk Oblast, and joined the Army. It was only disbanded in 1994.

Forces in the 1980s
21st Air Defence Corps
4th Air Defence Division
5th Air Defence Division
23rd Air Defence Division

Fighter Regiments of the 10th Army PVO 1988

The army was disbanded on 1 December 1994.

References

Further reading
V.I. Feskov, Golikov V.I., K.A. Kalashnikov, and S.A. Slugin, The Armed Forces of the USSR after World War II, from the Red Army to the Soviet (Part 1: Land Forces). (В.И. Слугин С.А. Вооруженные силы СССР после Второй Мировой войны: от Красной Армии к Советской (часть 1: Сухопутные войска)) Tomsk, 2013.  Improved version of 2004 work with many inaccuracies corrected.
«На страже северного неба» (Москва, 2005) председатель совета ветеранов 10-й армии ПВО генерал-майор А. С. Иванов.

Armies of the Soviet Air Defence Forces
Military units and formations established in 1960
Military units and formations disestablished in 1994